Luis Eduardo Chebel Klein Nunes  (born 17 April 1990), simply known as Dudu, is a Brazilian professional footballer who currently plays for Hong Kong Premier League club Southern.

He is a versatile midfielder and can play as a defensive midfielder or at centre back.

Club career
Dudu came through the youth system of Brasilian Série A giants Santos, where he once captained Neymar.

In 2013, he transferred to Resende. Dudu scored the winning header for Resende, in their 3-2 away win at national giants Flamengo.

In 2016, Dudu joined Hong Kong Premier League club Tai Po. In the 2018-19 season, he was part of the squad that won Tai Po's historical first-ever league title. In the 2019-20 season, he captained the club, becoming the first foreign captain in Tai Po history.

On 1 June 2020, it was revealed that Dudu had agreed to sign with R&F. On 14 October 2020, Dudu left the club after its withdrawal from the HKPL in the new season.

On 3 February 2021, it was revealed that Dudu had agreed to sign with Eastern.

On 4 July 2021, Dudu joined Southern.

Honours

Club
Tai Po
 Hong Kong Premier League: 2018–19

References

External links
 
 Luis Eduardo Chebel Klein Nunes at HKFA
 

1990 births
Living people
Brazilian footballers
Santos FC players
Clube Náutico Marcílio Dias players
Resende Futebol Clube players
Red Bull Brasil players
Clube Atlético Penapolense players
Tai Po FC players
R&F (Hong Kong) players
Eastern Sports Club footballers
Southern District FC players
Hong Kong Premier League players
Brazilian expatriate sportspeople in Hong Kong
Expatriate footballers in Hong Kong
Association football midfielders
Association football defenders
People from Ribeirão Preto
Footballers from São Paulo (state)